Abdul Wahid Arisar    (11 October 1949 – 3 May 2015) was a notable scholar, writer, researcher and  Sindhi politician who was one of the heads of the Jeay Sindh Qaumi Mahaz (JSQM), a political party in Sindh. It was reported that there were significant "differences" between Arisar and the head of another faction in the JSQM, Bashir Qureshi. Arisar had previously been chairman of the party in the 1990s.

Bibliography
The following is a list of books written by Abdul Wahid Arisar, including  his prison diaries, reviews and his research work, as well as writings on his struggle for freedom.

Death
Arisar was suffering from kidney disorder, he had been under treatment in a private hospital at Hyderabad, when his ailment became so severe that he was brought to Karachi and died in Karachi, Pakistan at the age of 65 on 3 May 2015.

See also
 Sindhudesh
 G M Syed
 Muhammad Ibrahim Joyo
 Jeay Sindh Qaumi Mahaz
 Sindh
 Sindhi
 Indus Valley

References

People from Sindh
2015 deaths
1949 births
Sindhi people